Mahmid (also Romanized as Maḩmīd; also known as Maḩmūd and Shahīd Moḩammad Bāqer-e Şadr) is a village in Hoseynabad Rural District, in the Central District of Shush County, Khuzestan Province, Iran. At the 2006 census, its population was 445, in 61 families.

References 

Populated places in Shush County